Helmut Holzapfel may refer to:
 Helmut Holzapfel (urban planner)
 Helmut Holzapfel (tenor)